Te Aath Diwas is an Indian Marathi language film directed by Shyam Swarnlata Dhanorkar. The film starring Renuka Shahane, Tushar Dalvi, Deepali Muchrikar and Avinash Masurekar. Music by Vikas Bhatavdekar and Pankaj Padghan. The film was released on 30th October 2015.

Synopsis 
A woman leaves her one-year-old daughter to pursue her career in the USA. Things take a turn when she decides to return after eighteen long years to be a part of her daughter's wedding.

Cast 
Renuka Shahane as Vasundhara 
Tushar Dalvi as Sudhakar
Aaroh Velankar as Shrirang
Deepali Muchrikar as Praju
Avinash Masurekar as Aaba
Sunil Joshi
Atul Todankar
Meena Sonavane
Abhilasha Patil
Suhasini Paranjpe

Soundtrack

Critical reception 
Te Aath Divas movie received mixed reviews from critics. Ganesh Matkari of Pune Mirror wrote "All said and done, Te Aath Divas is not a bad film, but a film without ambition. In spite of the thought provoking material, it is happy to deliver a moderate result, and a predictable one". Soumitra Pote of Maharashtra Times gave the film 2.5 stars out of 5 and wrote "Overall, the concept is good. If it could have been painted with such fine thought, te aath diwas  would have been unforgettable". Raj Chinchankar of Lokmat Says"There is no sloppiness anywhere in it. Of course the credit has to be given to the story, screenplay, dialogue Shashank Kewale and director Shyam Dhanorkar". A Reviewer of Zee Talkies wrote "If you are keen to watch a family entertainer, ‘Te Aath Divas’ is the right choice. Try not keeping very high expectations from this film though".

References

External links
 

2015 films
2010s Marathi-language films
Indian drama films